Sansai may refer to:
Sansai, wild mountain vegetables used in Japanese cuisine
Sansai Books, a manga publisher
Sansai Station, a railway station in Nagano, Japan
Sansai Zue, a Chinese encyclopedia compiled and completed during the Ming Dynasty

See also
Sensei (disambiguation)
San Sai (disambiguation), several places in Thailand